Garrett Nolan Crochet (born June 21, 1999) is an American professional baseball pitcher for the Chicago White Sox of Major League Baseball (MLB).

The White Sox selected Crochet with the 11th overall selection of the 2020 MLB draft out of the University of Tennessee. Crochet was called up in September by the White Sox to become the first MLB player in six years to reach the big leagues in the same year in which he was drafted.

Amateur career
Crochet grew up in Ocean Springs, Mississippi, and attended Ocean Springs High School. During his junior season, he posted a 3–0 win–loss record with a 0.51 earned run average (ERA) and 25 strikeouts in  innings pitched. Following the season, Crochet initially committed to play college baseball at Jones County Junior College. As a senior, he went 6–4 with a 1.48 ERA and 76 strikeouts to draw late recruiting interest from many top collegiate programs, including Texas and Tennessee. Crochet was selected by the Milwaukee Brewers in the 34th round of the 2017 Major League Baseball draft, but chose not to sign and instead enrolled at Tennessee.

As a true freshman at Tennessee in 2018, Crochet appeared in 17 games with 11 starts, posting a 5–6 record with a 5.51 ERA and 62 strikeouts. In 2019, his sophomore year, he went 5–3 with a 4.02 ERA over 18 appearances (six starts), missing the SEC Tournament after suffering a broken jaw in his last regular season start. After the season Crochet was invited to training camp for the United States Collegiate National Baseball Team, and entered his junior season as a first team preseason All-American by Baseball America and on the watch list for the Golden Spikes Award. Crochet missed the first three weeks of the season due to arm soreness, then appeared in one game before the college baseball season was cut short due to the COVID-19 pandemic.

Professional career
The White Sox selected Crochet in the first round, with the 11th overall selection, in the 2020 Major League Baseball draft, and he signed a contract on June 22, 2020, that included a $4,547,500 bonus.

On September 18, 2020, Crochet became the first player from the 2020 MLB Draft class to be promoted to the major leagues. He is the 22nd player to go straight from the draft to the majors without playing in the minor leagues, and the first since Mike Leake in 2010 and was the first player to be promoted in their draft year since Brandon Finnegan in 2014. With the 2020 Chicago White Sox, Crochet appeared in five games, not allowing a run in six innings pitched while consistently throwing . He came out of the bullpen to strike out both batters he faced in Chicago's 6–4 loss to the Oakland Athletics in the decisive Game 3 of the 2020 American League Wild Card Series before leaving with forearm tightness. Crochet had his first full season in 2021, when he recorded a 2.82 ERA with 65 strikeouts in  innings. Crochet would miss the entire 2022 season after undergoing Tommy John surgery on April 2.

References

External links

Tennessee Volunteers bio

1999 births
Living people
People from Ocean Springs, Mississippi
Baseball players from Mississippi
Major League Baseball pitchers
Chicago White Sox players
Tennessee Volunteers baseball players
United States national baseball team players